The Nebraska Cornhuskers women's golf team represents the University of Nebraska–Lincoln in the Big Ten Conference.  The program was established in 1975 and has made the NCAA championships four times. Nebraska has had twenty golfers named first-team all-conference selections.

The team has been coached by Lisa Johnson since 2019.

Coaches

Coaching history

Coaching staff

Awards

Season-by-season results

Notes

References

Big Ten Conference women's golf